Donald R. Fraser (May 21, 1927 – December 28, 2010) was a member of the Ohio House of Representatives.

References

Republican Party members of the Ohio House of Representatives
1927 births
2010 deaths
People from Perrysburg, Ohio